Eura is a municipality of Finland. It is located in the province of Western Finland and is part of the Satakunta region.

The municipality is unilingually Finnish. The municipality of Kiukainen was consolidated with Eura on 1 January 2009.

The municipality is one of the most distinguished places in Finland in terms of pre-historical findings. The archaeological findings are mainly from the Iron Age and include e.g. ancient dress "Euran Emännän Puku".

Local tradition had it still in the 18th century that a decisive battle against invading Sweden was held in Eura's Big Meadow (Iso Niitty) in the Middle Ages. According to the story, there was blood up to man's ankles on the meadow.

Trance producer and DJ, Ville Virtanen (better known by his stage name Darude) is from Eura.

Politics 
Results of the 2011 Finnish parliamentary election in Eura:

Social Democratic Party   32.9%
Centre Party   22.8%
True Finns   16.1%
Left Alliance   12.2%
National Coalition Party   10.9%
Christian Democrats   2.5%
Green League   2.0%

Twin towns - Sister cities 

Eura is twinned with:

  Harku Parish, Estonia
  Askersund Municipality, Sweden

See also 
 Eurajoki
 Panelia

References

External links 

Municipality of Eura – Official website

 
Populated places established in 1866
1866 establishments in the Russian Empire